Sinosuidasia is a genus of mites in the family Acaridae.

Species
 Sinosuidasia jinyunensis Zhang & Li, 2002
 Sinosuidasia orientalis Jiang, 1996

References

Acaridae